Erin Cardillo (born February 17, 1977) is an American actress, producer, and television writer.

Biography
Cardillo was born in White Plains, New York. Her father is Catholic and her mother is Jewish. She began her acting career while at Greenwich High School in Greenwich, Connecticut. She then attended Northwestern University from which she graduated magna cum laude in 1999 with a Bachelor of Science degree in performance studies. It was there that she began to explore writing and adaptation, as well as acting. She spent her junior year abroad in London, through Marymount College, where she cultivated her great love of Shakespeare. She has appeared in an Arby's commercial with her  The Suite Life on Deck co-star Windell D. Middlebrooks.

Personal life
Cardillo married actor Joe Towne on November 5, 2011. The couple welcomed their first child, a son named Lucas Bodhi, on December 17, 2016.

Filmography

Film

Television

References

External links

American soap opera actresses
1977 births
Actresses from New York (state)
Living people
People from White Plains, New York
Northwestern University School of Communication alumni
21st-century American actresses
American film actresses
American television actresses
Greenwich High School alumni